Liquidator may refer to:

Business

 Liquidator (law), the officer who collects the assets of and settles the claims against a company before dissolving it
 Estate liquidator, the person given the job of personal estate liquidation
 Computer liquidator, a purchaser and reseller of computer technology and related equipment

Arts
 "The Liquidator" (instrumental), a reggae instrumental by the Harry J Allstars
 The Liquidator (novel), the first novel of John Gardner
 The Liquidator (1965 film), a 1965 British spy film, adaptation of the novel, starring Rod Taylor
 The Liquidator (soundtrack), the soundtrack album by Lalo Schifrin
The Liquidator (2017 film), Chinese film
 The Liquidator (TV Series), a Canadian reality television series
 The Liquidator (Darkwing Duck), fictional character in television animation

Other
 Chernobyl liquidators, disaster-remediation workers
 Liquidator, a member of one of the factions of the RSDLP (Russian Social Democratic Labor Party)
 Liquidator, a water gun sold in Italy in the 1990s, similar to Super Soaker

See also
 Liquidate